The First Twenty Years is a compilation album by American progressive rock band Spock's Beard. The 2-CD and DVD set features tracks from each of the band's first twelve studio albums, as well as one newly recorded song, "Falling for Forever", written by Neal Morse, which features all current and past members of the band (with the exception of original bassist John Ballard, who left prior to the recording of their first album). The DVD contains live and archival footage of the band. All tracks have been remastered by Rich Mouser. It was released on November 20, 2015

Falling for Forever was played live in 2016 with all current and past members of the band during the Snow Live concert at Morsefest in Nashville, Tennessee and the Night of the Prog festival in Loreley, Germany. It was later released in 2017 as part of the Snow Live Blu-ray DVD release.

Track listing

Personnel
Neal Morse - vocals, guitar, keyboards, synths (Disc 1: all tracks. Disc 2: track 7)
Alan Morse - guitar, vocals
Nick D'Virgilio - drums, vocals, guitar, keyboards (Disc 1: all tracks. Disc 2: tracks 1-4, 7)
Dave Meros - bass, vocals, keyboards
Ryo Okumoto - keyboards, vocals (all tracks except Disc 1: track 1)
Jimmy Keegan - drums, vocals (Disc 2: tracks 5-7)
Ted Leonard - vocals, guitar (Disc 2: tracks 5-7)

References

2015 compilation albums
Spock's Beard albums
Inside Out Music albums